Angur Baba Joshi (15 August 1932 – 20 June 2020) was a Nepali social activist and the first Nepalese woman principal. Joshi died in 2020 in Kathmandu, Nepal, aged 87. She is widely renowned as a progressive figure in Nepal's education system, particularly for her role in women's empowerment in education with education policies and schemes.

Early life
She was born on 15 August1932 at Dilli Bazar, as daughter of Mr. Pitamber Prasad Panth, and Mrs. Deep Kumari Panth. Joshi was betrothed (in a time when early marriages were still the norm) at the age of 11 to the future Professor Dr. Bal Ram Joshi, who was just 12 then. She had one son, Kiran, and two daughters, Prava and Jyoti.

Education field
After returning from England, where she graduated from Oxford University, she started her career as the principal of Padma Kanya College, the first women's college in Nepal, from 1953 until 1973. She was the first woman in Nepal to work as a school administrator.

Awards
 Jagadamba Puraskar (2014)
 Gorkha Dakshin Bahu, II class
 Trishakti Patta, III class
 Mahendra Vidya Bhushan, I Class

See also
Godawari Vidhya Mandir
Rangu Souriya

References

External links
 Angur Baba Joshi: SamajSudharAandolanko Diyo

Nepalese activists
Nepalese women activists
Nepalese social workers
1932 births
2020 deaths
People from Kathmandu
Jagadamba Shree Puraskar winners